The Irisbus Arway (SFR160) is a class of single-decker intercity buses produced by Irisbus in Vysoké Mýto, Czech Republic.

The Arway was a single-decker coach for suburban routes. The bus was designed to replace the MyWay (original Iveco model) and the Ares (original Renault model), whence came the name Arway. The Arway was equipped with a heating and air conditioning (HVAC) system, music and announcement system and also, optionally, a wheelchair lift. It has two doors, with the central one available in single or double width.

The engine was an IVECO Cursor 8, Euro IV standard, with a 7,880 cc displacement, developing 330 or 380 hp, depending on the version. The first Arways were delivered in France in 2006. In Italy, the model is in service with public transport companies at Piacenza, Ferrara, Brescia, Lodi, Rome and Naples and in Spain can be found with various public transport companies including Madrid.

See also 
 List of buses

Buses of France
Coaches (bus)
Intercity buses
Arway
Buses of the Czech Republic